Crystal Ballroom is a name associated with various buildings and ballrooms worldwide, including:

Crystal Ballroom (Portland, Oregon), a historic building in Portland, Oregon, United States
Crystal Ballroom (Melbourne), a music venue in Australia
The ballroom of the Rice Hotel in Houston, Texas, United States
The ballroom of the Empress Hotel in Victoria, British Columbia, Canada
The former ballroom of Crystal Beach Park in Crystal Beach, Ontario
Live at the Crystal Ballroom is a live DVD by The Black Keys, filmed in the Portland, Oregon Crystal Ballroom